Stryker is a 2004 film by Noam Gonick about gang violence in North End Winnipeg, Manitoba.

The film follows a 14-year-old arsonist (Kyle Henry) who becomes involved in a turf war between the Indian Posse and the Asian Bomb Squad (a now-defunct Filipino gang). He is known only as Stryker, a slang term for a prospective gang member.

Music for the film was composed by Karman Omeosoo of Team Rezofficial.

Plot 
Running away from his reserve after burning down a church, 14-year-old Stryker (Kyle Henry) ends up in North End, Winnipeg.

Becoming involved in a turf war, he is stuck between joining either the Indian Posse, led by an Indigenous lesbian named Mama Ceece (Deena Fontaine), recently released from jail; or the Asian Bomb Squad, a Filipino gang headed by Omar (Ryan Black), who is part-Indigenous.

References

External links
 
 
 

2004 films
Films shot in Winnipeg
Films set in Winnipeg
2000s gang films
Canadian crime drama films
Canadian LGBT-related films
2004 LGBT-related films
LGBT-related drama films
English-language Canadian films
Films directed by Noam Gonick
First Nations films
Films about organized crime in Canada
Crime in Manitoba
Films about Asian Canadians
2000s English-language films
2000s Canadian films